Warning system is any system of biological or technical nature deployed by an individual or group to inform of a future danger. Its purpose is to enable the deployer of the warning system to prepare for the danger and act accordingly to mitigate or avoid it.

Warnings cannot be effective unless people react to them. People are more likely to ignore a system that regularly produces false warnings (the cry-wolf effect), but reducing the number of false warnings generally also increases the risk of not giving a warning when it is needed. Some warnings are non-specific: for instance, the probability of an earthquake of a certain magnitude in a certain area over the next decade. Such warnings cannot be used to guide short-term precautions such as evacuation. Opportunities to take long-term precautions, such as better building codes and disaster preparedness, may be ignored.

Biological warning systems
Aposematism (e.g. warning coloration)
Climate canary
Fear
Miner's canary
Pain

Man-made warning systems
Emergency population warning

Civilian warning systems

 Alberta Emergency Alert
 Alberta Emergency Public Warning System (replaced by Alberta Emergency Alert)
 Alert Ready (Canada)
 Automatic Warning System
 Child abduction alert system
 Dam safety system
 Earthquake warning system
 Emergency Alert System (EAS) (United States)
 Famine Early Warning Systems Network
 Federal Civil Defense Authority
 Fire alarm system
 Gale warning
 Ground proximity warning system
 Indian Ocean Tsunami Warning System
 International Early Warning Programme
 J-Alert (Japan)
 Lane departure warning system
 National Severe Weather Warning Service
 N.E.A.R. (National Emergency Alarm Repeater)
 North Warning System
 Standard Emergency Warning Signal (Australia)
 Traffic Collision Avoidance System
 Train Protection & Warning System
 Tsunami warning system

Military warning systems
Historical beacon-based systems:
 Byzantine beacon system in Asia Minor during the 9th century

Space-based missile early warning systems:
 Defense Support Program (United States, to be succeeded by the "Space-Based Infrared System")
 Space-Based Infrared System (SBIRS) (United States)
 Oko, also known as "SPRN" (Russia)

Airborne early warning systems:
 Airborne Early Warning and Control ("AWACS" for NATO, many countries have developed their own AEW&C systems)

Ground-based early warning radar systems:
 Ballistic Missile Early Warning System and PAVE PAWS (United States)
 Duga radar, also known as the "Russian Woodpecker" (Russia)
 Dnestr radar (1st generation Russian)
 Daryal radar (2nd generation Russian)
 Voronezh radar (3rd and current generation Russian)
 Chain Home (British, now defunct)
 Chain Home Low (British, now defunct)
 ROTOR (British, now defunct)

Optical sensors:
 Bomb Alarm System

Emergency broadcasting:
 CONELRAD (United States, succeeded by the Emergency Broadcast System)
 Emergency Broadcast System (EBS) (United States, succeeded by the Emergency Alert System)

See also
Alarm (disambiguation)

Notes and references 

Emergency communication
 

pl:System wczesnego ostrzegania